Isaac Sello Seitlholo (born 9 September 1989) is a South African politician, a Member of Parliament (MP) for the Democratic Alliance, and a member of the Portfolio Committee on Transport.

Background
Isaac Sello Seitlholo was born into a Tswana family on 9 September 1989. He matriculated from Tlokwe Secondary School in 2008. He holds a BA degree and a BA Honours degree in Development and Management and also a master's degree in Public Management and Governance from the North-West University.

Career
Prior to the 2009 general election, Seitlholo did some campaign work for the African National Congress. He then worked as a lecturer at North-West University.

In 2017, Seitlholo joined the Democratic Alliance as a provincial campaign director. He stood as a DA parliamentary candidate from the North West in the 2019 national elections, and was subsequently elected to the National Assembly and sworn in on 22 May 2019. In parliament, he serves on the Portfolio Committee on Transport.

In November 2020, Seitlholo declared his candidacy for deputy provincial leader of the DA. He lost to Freddy Sonakile at the party's provincial congress.

References

External links

Living people
1989 births
Tswana people
People from North West (South African province)
African National Congress politicians
Democratic Alliance (South Africa) politicians
Members of the National Assembly of South Africa